The Gulf of Fonseca mangroves ecoregion (WWF ID: NT1412) covers the brackish mangrove forests around the Gulf of Fonseca on the Pacific Ocean.  The Gulf is the meeting point El Salvador, Honduras, and Nicaragua.  The Gulf is one of the two primary nesting sites of the critically endangered Hawksbill turtle (Eretmochelys imbricata) in the eastern Pacific.  In the Honduras portion, there are seven nature reserves that collectively make up a RAMSAR wetland of international importance ("Sistema de Humedales de la Zona Sur de Honduras"), providing protection for migratory birds, sea turtle, and fish.

Location and description
There are a variety of habitat types on the margins of the Gulf of Fonseca  - mangrove forests, mudflats, sandy beaches and rocky cliffs.  The mangroves tend to line the lagoons, bays, and flat lowlands.

Climate
The climate of the ecoregion is Tropical savanna climate - dry winter (Köppen climate classification (Aw)).  This climate is characterized by relatively even temperatures throughout the year, and a pronounced dry season.  The driest month has less than 60 mm of precipitation, and is drier than the average month.

Flora and fauna
The most common mangrove tree species in the ecoregion are red mangrove (Rhizophora mangle) and Rhizophora racemosa.  Associated species include Avicennia bicolor, and black mangrove (Avicennia germinans)

Protected areas
Officially protected areas in the ecoregion include:
 Estero Padre Ramos Natural Reserve in Chinandega Department of Nicaragua
 Estero Real Natural Reserve in Chinandega Department of Nicaragua
There are also nature reserves along the inlets at Chismuyo Bay, San Lorenzo Bay, Las Iguanas and Punta Condega, Jicarito, and San Bernardo.

References

Neotropical ecoregions
Ecoregions of El Salvador
Ecoregions of Honduras
Ecoregions of Nicaragua
Mangrove ecoregions
Tropical Eastern Pacific